The United States Senate Journal is a written record of proceedings within the United States Senate in accordance with Article I, Section 5 of the U.S. Constitution.

According to the Library of Congress, the Senate Journal should be seen as the minutes of floor action. It notes the matters considered by the Senate and the votes and other actions taken. It does not record the actual debates, which can be consulted through the "Link to date-related documents" in the full text transcription of the Journal. Historically, the Journal of the Senate, like Journal of the House of Representatives and Journals of the House of Commons and the House of Lords in British Parliament, was an important source of parliamentary law.

See also 
 Congressional Record
 Federal Register, the official daily publication for rules, proposed rules, and notices of US federal agencies and organizations
 Hansard, British parliamentary record
 United States House Journal

References

Sources
 Library of Congress: United States Senate Journal
https://scholarship.law.upenn.edu/cgi/viewcontent.cgi?article=1699&context=jcl

United States Senate
Publications of the United States Congress